Carex dianae is a tussock-forming species of perennial sedge in the family Cyperaceae. It is native to St Helena.

See also
List of Carex species

References

dianae
Plants described in 1855
Taxa named by Ernst Gottlieb von Steudel
Flora of Saint Helena